Nick Mitchell (born 1 February 1973) is a former Australian rules footballer who played with Fitzroy in the Australian Football League (AFL).

Mitchell, a left-footer, was recruited from St. Bernard's. He played five games in the 1994 AFL season and four games in the 1995 season.

References

External links
 
 

1973 births
Australian rules footballers from Victoria (Australia)
Fitzroy Football Club players
Living people